Negovan Crag (‘Negovanski Kamak’ \'ne-go-van-ski ka-'m&k\) is the peak rising to 746 m in Kondofrey Heights on Trinity Peninsula, Antarctic Peninsula.  Situated 2.3 km east of Mount Reece, 9.48 km south of Mount Daimler, 8.6 km northeast of Mount Bradley and 5.55 km west-northwest of Pitt Point.  Surmounting Victory Glacier to the north and Chudomir Cove to the southeast.

The peak is named after the settlement of Negovan in western Bulgaria.

Location
German-British mapping in 1996.

Maps
 Trinity Peninsula. Scale 1:250000 topographic map No. 5697. Institut für Angewandte Geodäsie and British Antarctic Survey, 1996.
 Antarctic Digital Database (ADD). Scale 1:250000 topographic map of Antarctica. Scientific Committee on Antarctic Research (SCAR). Since 1993, regularly updated.

Notes

References
 Bulgarian Antarctic Gazetteer. Antarctic Place-names Commission. (details in Bulgarian, basic data in English)
 Negovan Crag. SCAR Composite Antarctic Gazetteer

External links
 Negovan Crag. Copernix satellite image

Mountains of Trinity Peninsula
Bulgaria and the Antarctic